The NCHC All-Tournament Team is an honor bestowed at the conclusion of the conference tournament to the players judged to have performed the best during the championship. The team is composed of three forwards, two defensemen and one goaltender with additional players named in the event of a tie.

The All-Tournament Team was first awarded after the inaugural championship in 2014.

All-Tournament Teams

2010s

2020s

All-Tournament Team players by school

Multiple appearances

See also
NCHC Awards
Tournament MVP

References

External links
The Official Site of the National Collegiate Hockey Conference

College ice hockey trophies and awards in the United States